Orthophytum atalaiense is a plant species in the genus Orthophytum.

The bromeliad is endemic to Alagoas state in the Atlantic Forest biome (Mata Atlantica Brasileira), located in southeastern Brazil.

References

atalaiense
Endemic flora of Brazil
Flora of Alagoas
Flora of the Atlantic Forest